Vovchansk is a  Ukrainian city in Chuhuiv Raion of Kharkiv Oblast (province). It hosts the administration of Vovchansk hromada (urban settlement), one of the hromadas of Ukraine. Population:

History 
The settlement was settled in 1674 when a territory of Belgorod Monastery was provided to Ukrainian settlers from Dnieper Ukraine led by Martyn Starochudny. The settlement was named as Vovche and designated as a guarding settlement.

In April 1780 it was officially renamed as Vovchansk and became an administrative centre of Volchansk uyezd in the Kharkov Governorate of the Russian Empire. The year 1780 is considered by the Verkhovna Rada as the official date of the city establishment. Between 1674 and 1780 a lot of changes took place and the borders of the Russian Empire moved away from the settlement.

In 1896 a Belgorod – Donbas railroad was installed through the town.

A local newspaper has been published here since February 1918.

It became a part of the Donets-Krivoy Rog Soviet Republic, although in spring 1918 it was occupied by German troops. This lasted until November 1918.

The economic crisis that began in 2008 hit the local industry. A dairy factory that was built here by Soviet Union stopped work and in December 2009 ceased to exist.

Until 18 July 2020, Vovchansk was the administrative center of Vovchansk Raion. The raion was abolished in July 2020 as part of the administrative reform of Ukraine, which reduced the number of raions of Kharkiv Oblast to seven. The area of Vovchansk Raion was merged into Chuhuiv Raion.

Vovchansk was occupied by Russia during the 2022 Russian Invasion of Ukraine, and retaken by Ukraine on 11 September 2022 as part of a major counteroffensive in the Kharkiv region.

Notable people
 Alexandra Snezhko-Blotskaya, animated films director (21 February 1909 – 29 December 1980)
 Orest Somov, writer (gothic and gothic-romantic genres) (21 December 1793 – 8 June 1833)
 Vasyl Babenko (1877 – 1955), Imperial Russian archeologist, born in Vovchansk
 Edward Balcerzan (1937), Polish literary critic and poet

Gallery

See also
Vilcha
FC Vovchansk

References

External links

Cities in Kharkiv Oblast
Volchansky Uyezd
Cities of district significance in Ukraine
Cities and towns built in the Sloboda Ukraine
Populated places established in the Russian Empire
Russia–Ukraine border crossings